Vincent Street is a street in Perth, Western Australia. It runs west-east, separating the suburbs of West Perth and Perth from North Perth.

The street is believed to have been named by the chief draftsman in the Lands Department, George Vincent, after himself in about 1876. Vincent was the recipient of the land on the north side of the street, east of Charles Street, in the first Crown grant of Perth. The local government area City of Vincent was named after the street (on which the city council chambers are located).

Notable places along Vincent Street include:
 Luna Leederville cinema
 Leederville Oval
 Beatty Park Leisure Centre
 Redemptorist Monastery
 Hyde Park

References 

 
Streets in North Perth, Western Australia
West Perth, Western Australia
Highgate, Western Australia